Acholeplasma laidlawii are small bacteria which lack a cell wall. Like other Acholeplasma and Mycoplasma, A. laidlawii has been identified as a common contaminant of growth media for cell culture.

History 
A. laidlawii was first isolated from sewage in London in 1936 and was named after its discoverer, Patrick Laidlaw.

Genetics 
A. laidlawii has a relatively small genome comprising 1.5Mbp. Additionally its genome has a low GC-content of just 31%. The A. laidlawii genome has been sequenced.

In Research 
Acholeplasma laidlawii may contaminate bovine serum and also occurs in serum-free cell culture media products. The presence of A. laidlawii in broth powders is a serious problem in routine biopharmaceutical operations where filtration is used as a sterilisation procedure. A. laidlawii may flourish and survive for prolonged periods at refrigeration and ambient temperatures in serum-free cell culture media.

References

External links 
Type strain of Acholeplasma laidlawii at BacDive -  the Bacterial Diversity Metadatabase
A. laidlawii genome sequence from NCBI.

Mollicutes
Bacteria described in 1941